This list of plesiosaurs is a comprehensive listing of all genera that have ever been included in the order Plesiosauria, excluding purely vernacular terms. The list includes all commonly accepted genera, but also genera that are now considered invalid, doubtful (nomen dubium), or were not formally published (nomen nudum), as well as junior synonyms of more established names, and genera that are no longer considered plesiosaurs. The list currently includes 201 genera.

Scope and terminology
There is no official, canonical list of plesiosaur genera but one of the most thorough attempts can be found on the Plesiosauria section of Mikko Haaramo's Phylogeny Archive; also pertinent is the Plesiosaur Genera section at Adam Stuart Smith's Plesiosaur Directory.

Naming conventions and terminology follow the International Code of Zoological Nomenclature. Technical terms used include:
 Junior synonym: A name which describes the same taxon as a previously published name. If two or more genera are formally designated and the type specimens are later assigned to the same genus, the first to be published (in chronological order) is the senior synonym, and all other instances are junior synonyms. Senior synonyms are generally used, except by special decision of the ICZN, but junior synonyms cannot be used again, even if deprecated. Junior synonymy is often subjective, unless the genera described were both based on the same type specimen.
Nomen nudum (Latin for "naked name"): A name that has appeared in print but has not yet been formally published by the standards of the ICZN. Nomina nuda (the plural form) are invalid, and are therefore not italicized as a proper generic name would be. If the name is later formally published, that name is no longer a nomen nudum and will be italicized on this list. Often, the formally published name will differ from any nomina nuda that describe the same specimen. In this case, these nomina nuda will be deleted from this list in favor of the published name.
Preoccupied name: A name that is formally published, but which has already been used for another taxon. This second use is invalid (as are all subsequent uses) and the name must be replaced. As preoccupied names are not valid generic names, they will also go unitalicized on this list.
Nomen dubium (Latin for "dubious name"): A name describing a fossil with no unique diagnostic features. As this can be an extremely subjective and controversial designation, this term is not used on this list.

The list

See also

 Sauropterygia
 Plesiosaur
 List of dinosaurs
 List of ichthyosaurs
 List of mosasaurs
 List of pterosaurs

Footnotes

References
 
 

 Genera
Plesiosaurs
Plesiosaurs
Genera